James Lin is the name of:
James Lin Xili (1918–2009), underground Roman Catholic bishop of Wenzhou, China
Yoga Lin (born 1987), Taiwanese singer
James Lin Bingliang, Roman Catholic archbishop of the Roman Catholic Archdiocese of Guangzhou
James Lin, an unsuccessful candidate in the 2018 Vancouver municipal election

See also
James Linn (1749–1821), American politician
James Ling (1922–2004), American businessman
Jimmy Lin (born 1974), Taiwanese actor